God Bless The Blake Babies is the fourth full length album by the Blake Babies, released in 2001 (see 2001 in music).  This album was recorded during the Blake Babies brief reunion.

Track listing

Personnel
Juliana Hatfield - vocals, guitars, bass, piano and keyboards
John Strohm - vocals, guitars, bass and keyboards
Freda Love Smith - vocals and drums
Evan Dando - bass, vocals and guitars
Jake Smith - guitars, piano and background vocals
Paul Mahern - programming

Production
Producer: Paul Mahern and Blake Babies
Engineer: Mark Maher and Andy Snyder
Mastering: Greg Calbi

References

Blake Babies albums
2001 albums
Zoë Records albums